A Life for the Taking is a 1995 Swedish drama film directed by Göran du Rées. It was entered into the 19th Moscow International Film Festival.

Cast
 Hans Mosesson as Stig F. Dahlman
 Björn Granath as Björn Granath
 Benny Granberg as Benny
 Niklas Hald as Clark
 Barbro Kollberg as Signe Dahlman
 Jussi Larnö as Ensio
 Anna Lindholm as Eva
 Anneli Martini as Måna
 Bibi Nordin as Vera Lundberg
 Terri-Lynne Sandberg as Birgitta

References

External links
 
 

1995 films
1995 drama films
Swedish drama films
Films based on Swedish novels
1990s Swedish-language films
Films directed by Göran du Rées
1990s Swedish films